Paul John Lake, OAM (born 6 June 1970) is an Australian Paralympic cyclist.  He was born in Melbourne. He won a silver medal at the 1996 Atlanta Games in the Mixed Omnium LC2 event. At the 2000 Sydney Games, he won a gold medal in the Mixed Team Olympic Sprint LC1–3 event, for which he received a Medal of the Order of Australia, a silver medal in the Mixed Individual Pursuit LC2 event, and a bronze medal in the Mixed 1 km Time Trial LC2 event. He was an Australian Institute of Sport scholarship holder in 1995 and 1997.

References

Paralympic cyclists of Australia
Cyclists at the 1996 Summer Paralympics
Cyclists at the 2000 Summer Paralympics
Medalists at the 1996 Summer Paralympics
Medalists at the 2000 Summer Paralympics
Paralympic gold medalists for Australia
Paralympic silver medalists for Australia
Paralympic bronze medalists for Australia
Recipients of the Medal of the Order of Australia
Cyclists from Melbourne
Australian Institute of Sport Paralympic cyclists
1970 births
Living people
Australian male cyclists
Paralympic medalists in cycling